Bernard Bosanquet  (14 June 1848 – 8 February 1923) was an English philosopher and political theorist, and an influential figure on matters of political and social policy in the late 19th and early 20th centuries. His work influenced but was later subject to criticism by many thinkers, notably Bertrand Russell, John Dewey and William James. Bernard was the husband of Helen Bosanquet, the leader of the Charity Organisation Society.

Life
Born at Rock Hall near Alnwick, Bosanquet was the son of Robert William Bosanquet, a Church of England clergyman. He was educated at Harrow School and Balliol College, Oxford. After graduation, he was elected to a Fellowship at University College, Oxford, but, after receiving a substantial inheritance upon the death of his father in 1880, resigned it in order to devote himself to philosophical research. He moved to London in 1881,<ref>'Britannica]</ref> where he became an active member of the London Ethical Society and the Charity Organisation Society. Both were positive demonstrations of Bosanquet's ethical philosophy. Bosanquet published on a wide range of topics, such as logic, metaphysics, aesthetics and political philosophy. In his metaphysics, he is regarded as a key representative (with F. H. Bradley) of absolute idealism, although it is a term that he abandoned in favour of "speculative philosophy".

He was one of the leaders of the so-called neo-Hegelian philosophical movement in Great Britain. He was strongly influenced by Plato and Aristotle, but also by the German philosophers Immanuel Kant and Georg Wilhelm Friedrich Hegel. Among his best-known works are The Philosophical Theory of the State (1899), his Gifford lectures, The Principle of Individuality and Value (1912) and The Value and Destiny of the Individual (1913).

Bosanquet was president of the Aristotelian Society from 1894 to 1898.

Idealist social theory

In his Encyclopedia, Section 95, Hegel had written about "the ideality of the finite." This obscure, seemingly meaningless, phrase was interpreted as implying that "what is finite is not real" because the ideal is understood as being the opposite of the real. Bosanquet was a follower of Hegel and the "central theme of Bosanquet's idealism was that every finite existence necessarily transcends itself and points toward other existences and finally to the whole. Thus, he advocated a system very close to that in which Hegel had argued for the ideality of the finite."

The relation of the finite individual to the whole state in which he or she lives was investigated in Bosanquet's Philosophical Theory of the State (London, 1899). In this book, he "argued that the state is the real individual and that individual persons are unreal by comparison with it." But Bosanquet did not think that the state has a right to impose social control over its individual citizens. "On the contrary, he believed that if society is organic and individual, then its elements can cooperate apart from a centralised organ of control, the need for which presupposes that harmony has to be imposed upon something that is naturally unharmonious."

The relationship between the individual and society was summarised in Bosanquet's preface to The Introduction to Hegel's Philosophy of Fine Art (1886):

Works
An extensive bibliography of works by and about Bernard Bosanquet has been produced by Prof. Colin Tyler (Centre for Idealism and the New Liberalism at the University of Hull, UK). It can be downloaded at: https://idealismandnewliberalism.org/bibliographies/ 

BooksAthenian Constitutional History, as represented in Grote's History of Greece, critically examined by G. F. Schoemann, translated by B. Bosanquet et al.(1878)A History of Aesthetic (1892, second edition 1904)Knowledge and Reality: A Criticism of Mr. F.H. Bradley's Principles of Logic (1885)The Introduction to Hegel's Philosophy of Fine Art translated and edited (1886)Logic, or The Morphology of Knowledge in two volumes: Volume 1, Volume 2 (1888; revised edition 1911)The Civilization of Christendom, and Other Studies (1893)Essentials of Logic; Being Ten Lectures on Judgment and Inference (1895)Companion to Plato's Republic for English Readers, Being a Commentary Adapted to Davies and Vaughan's Translation (1895)Essays and Addresses (1889)[https://archive.org/web/20121201020711/http://www.efm.bris.ac.uk/het/bosanquet/state.pdf The Philosophical Theory of The State (1899)Psychology of the Moral Self (1904)The Meaning of Teleology: A lecture read to the British Academy in 1906
The Principle of Individuality and Value, Macmillan, 1912. (Gifford Lectures, 1910–12)
 The Value and Destiny of the Individual, Macmillan, 1923. (Gifford Lectures, 1910–12)The Distinction between Mind and Its Objects (1913)
 Three Lectures on Aesthetic (1915)
 Social and International Ideals: Being Studies in Patriotism (1917)
 Some Suggestions in Ethics (1919)
 Croce's Aesthetic: A lecture read to the British Academy in 1919
 Implication and Linear Inference (1920)
 What Religion Is (1920)
 The Meetings of Extremes in Contemporary Philosophy (1921)

Articles
 Review of Benno Erdmann's Logik. Bd. 1. Logische Elementarlehre (Halle: Niemeyer 1892) by Bosanquet in Mind'' (1892), N.S. No. 2

References

External links
 
 Bernard Bosanquet – Encyclopædia Britannica, 1998
 
 Bernard Bosanquet page
 Archives Hub: Bosanquet Papers
 

1848 births
1923 deaths
19th-century British non-fiction writers
19th-century English philosophers
19th-century essayists
20th-century British non-fiction writers
20th-century English philosophers
20th-century essayists
Alumni of Balliol College, Oxford
Aristotelian philosophers
British ethicists
British male essayists
British social liberals
English Anglicans
Epistemologists
Fellows of the British Academy
Fellows of University College, Oxford
Idealists
Ontologists
People educated at Harrow School
People from Alnwick
Philosophers of art
Philosophers of logic
Philosophers of mind
Philosophers of psychology
Philosophers of religion
Philosophy writers
Political philosophers
Presidents of the Aristotelian Society
Social philosophers